Diparopsis is a genus of moths of the family Noctuidae, subfamily Hadeninae. It includes D. castanea, which is the type species and, known as the "red bollworm", is a significant pest of cotton crops in Africa.

Species
The Catalogue of Life lists:
 Diparopsis castanea
 Diparopsis gossypioides
 Diparopsis perditor
 Diparopsis tephragramma
 Diparopsis watersi

References

External links
Natural History Museum Lepidoptera genus database

Hadeninae